The 2015 FIA Formula 3 European Championship was a multi-event motor racing championship for single-seat open wheel formula racing cars that was held across Europe. The championship featured drivers competing in two-litre Formula Three racing cars which conform to the technical regulations, or formula, for the championship. It was the fourth edition of the FIA Formula 3 European Championship .

Esteban Ocon was the reigning drivers' champion, but he did not defend his title as he moved across to the GP3 Series. His team, Prema Powerteam, was the defending winners of the teams' championship.

Drivers and teams
The following teams and drivers competed during the 2015 season:

Driver changes
Joining FIA European Formula 3
 Alexander Albon, third in the 2014 Eurocup Formula Renault 2.0 season, joined Signature, where he was joined by 2014 French F4 runner-up Dorian Boccolacci.
 2014 German Formula Three driver Nicolas Beer joined EuroInternational.
 2014 Protyre Formula Renault champion Pietro Fittipaldi joined Fortec Motorsports. He was joined in the team by British Formula 3 competitors Hongwei Cao, Matt Rao and Zhi Cong Li.
 2014 BRDC F4 driver Raoul Hyman made his championship début with Team West-Tec F3.
 Callum Ilott moved into the series with Carlin, having been signed as a member of the Red Bull Junior Team.
 The top two drivers in the 2014 ADAC Formel Masters season, Mikkel Jensen and Maximilian Günther moved to the championship with Mücke Motorsport. The team's lineup was completed by Kang Ling, who predominantly competed in German Formula Three in 2014.
 2014 Formula Renault 2.0 Alps runner-up Charles Leclerc graduated to the series with Van Amersfoort Racing. He was joined by single-seaters débutant Alessio Lorandi and BRDC F4 runner-up Arjun Maini.
 2014 German Formula Three competitors Nabil Jeffri, Sam MacLeod and Markus Pommer joined the series with the Motopark squad. They was joined at the team by 2014 Italian F4 driver Mahaveer Raghunathan.
 Nicolas Pohler, who raced in the Euroformula Open Championship, joined Double R Racing for his series debut.
 2014 BRDC F4 champion George Russell joined Carlin for his series début.
 2014 Formula Renault 2.0 NEC driver Julio Moreno joined Threebond with T-Sport.
 Fabian Schiller graduated from ADAC Formel Masters to the championship with Team West-Tec F3.
 2014 Formula Masters China runner-up Matt Solomon joined Double R Racing for his European single-seater debut.
 Lance Stroll and Brandon Maïsano – the overall and Trophy winners in the 2014 Italian F4 championship – continued their collaboration with Prema Powerteam into the series.
 Ryan Tveter, who raced in Eurocup Formula Renault 2.0, graduated to the championship with Carlin.

Changing teams
 Michele Beretta, who raced for EuroInternational moved to Mücke Motorsport.
 Tatiana Calderón moved from Jo Zeller Racing to Carlin.
 Sérgio Sette Câmara, who competed for EuroInternational at Imola in 2014, switched to Motopark.
 Jake Dennis left Carlin to join Prema Powerteam for his second season of European Formula 3.
 Santino Ferrucci, who drove for EuroInternational and Fortec Motorsports in 2014, joined Beretta at Mücke Motorsport.
 2014 Van Amersfoort Racing driver Gustavo Menezes moved to Carlin, to replace Dennis.
 After three seasons with Mücke Motorsport, Felix Rosenqvist switched to Prema Powerteam.

Leaving FIA European Formula 3
 Van Amersfoort Racing driver Max Verstappen, who finished third in 2014, graduated to Formula One for Scuderia Toro Rosso.
 Prema Powerteam driver and 2014 champion Esteban Ocon stepped up to GP3 with ART Grand Prix.
 Mücke Motorsport driver Lucas Auer, who finished fourth in 2014 moved into the DTM with ART Grand Prix for the 2015 season. Jagonya Ayam with Carlin driver Tom Blomqvist will also move to the DTM, driving for BMW.
 Prema Powerteam driver Antonio Fuoco, who finished fifth in 2014, stepped up to GP3, with Carlin.
 Sean Gelael (Jagonya Ayam with Carlin), Nicholas Latifi (Prema) and Roy Nissany (Mücke) all moved to the Formula Renault 3.5 Series full-time. Gelael continued with Carlin, Latifi joined Arden International, and Nissany will be a part of the Tech 1 Racing team.
 Carlin driver Ed Jones, left the series to compete in the 2015 Indy Lights season, remaining with Carlin. Team West-Tec's Félix Serrallés will also move to Indy Lights, with Belardi Auto Racing.
 Carlin driver Jordan King, who finished seventh in 2014, stepped up to GP2, with Racing Engineering.

Team changes
 2013 and 2014 German Formula Three champions Motopark will make their debut in the championship.

Calendar

A provisional eleven-round calendar was announced on 4 December 2014. The series will return to Zandvoort (replacing the Hungaroring) after a one-year absence, while the Italian round has been moved from Autodromo Enzo e Dino Ferrari to Monza, still supporting the Italian GT Championship. On 3 May 2015, was announced that round at Moscow Raceway will be changed to Algarve International Circuit.

Results

Championship standings
Scoring system

Drivers' championship

The second and third races at Monza (both for safety car incidents) and the third race at Spielberg (rain) were red-flagged after three laps were completed, but before 75% of the scheduled distance in laps, the necessary distance required for a race to pay full points.  All three races paid half points to all classified finishers.

At Monza, the second race was red-flagged on Lap 14 of 19, with 2:20 remaining in the 35-minute race, as the Safety Car would have resulted in the race ending under caution because of multiple Safety Car periods caused by incidents.  The excessive number of incidents during the race resulted in a warning by officials during the drivers' meeting of proper driver conduct before the start of the third race.  A start crash involving Ryan Tveter and Fabian Schiller resulted in officials imposing an ultimatum that drivers be on their best behaviour or the race would be abandoned.  On lap six Lance Stroll and Mikkel Jensen collided causing the race to be red-flagged three laps later. As a result, series organisers awarded half points to each of the classified finishers eligible to score points. Rosenqvist won all three of the Monza races, but expressed frustration with the driving standards on display.

At Spielberg, the third race ended due to early torrential rain.

(key)

† — Drivers did not finish the race, but were classified as they completed over 90% of the race distance.

Rookies' Championship

Teams' championship
Prior to each round of the championship, two drivers from each team – if applicable – were nominated to score teams' championship points.

Footnotes

References

External links

FIA Formula 3 European Championship
FIA Formula 3 European Championship
FIA Formula 3 European Championship
Formula 3